Surfside Beach is a town in Horry County, South Carolina, United States. Its nickname is "The Family Beach". The population was 3,837 at the 2010 census, down from 4,425 in 2000. It is considered a part of the Grand Strand.

Geography
According to the United States Census Bureau Surfside Beach has a total area of 2.0 square miles (5.1 km2), of which 1.9 square miles (5.0 km2) is land and 0.04 square mile (0.1 km2) (1.02%) is water.

History
This portion of beach was mentioned in the 1765 diary of John Bartram, botanist, who lodged at what was presumably Stephen Peak's plantation, "at the west end of long bay". It was also mentioned in the 1773 journal of William Bartram, naturalist, who also "got to the West end of Long Bay, where [he] lodged at a large Indigo plantation." The plantation in question was called "The Ark", possibly because it was originally owned by "Mr. Aark." A 1838 survey recorded it having 3,194 acres. The plantation reported 57 slaves in 1850 and 63 in 1860. The main house was located near the ocean front (at 3rd Ave S and Willow Dr in present-day Surfside Beach) with several slave cabins just to the north along the ocean and a cemetery behind it (S Hollywood Dr on the west, to Juniper Dr on the north, to 6th Ave S on the east, to Cypress Dr on the south.) The main house served as shelter during the great hurricane of 1893. It was later used as an inn then to house beach lifeguards, before it was demolished in the 1960s. The cemetery, where many of the enslaved people of the plantation were buried, continued to be used by descendants of those enslaved families until 1952. In 1980, the town of Surfside Beach declared it abandoned, opening the area for development. The area once occupied by the cemetery is completely covered by residences.

Surfside Beach was first incorporated in 1964 with 881 residents. It was previously known as Roach's Beach and had only a few buildings surviving the hurricane of 1893. Principal industries were lumber and feed farming for the 30 or so horses and mules in the area. The new owner, Mr. George J. Holiday, renamed the area Floral Beach for his wife, Flora, and daughter, Floramay. In the late 1920s, a group from Columbia purchased and partially developed the land. In 1952, most of the land changed hands again and became known as Surfside Beach. The undeveloped beach area was covered with sand dunes. A one-lane sandy road led from the highway to a quiet beach.

Hurricane Hazel in 1954 destroyed 18 of the beach's 65 houses, but did not dampen the spirit of the developers. Lots were cleared, the sand was leveled, topsoil was brought in and T. J. Harrison, who later became the town's first mayor, opened the first grocery store in 1956 for the six permanent families and summer residents. Significant expansion did not occur until after 1956 when Myrtle Beach Air Force Base was reactivated. By 1964, its reputation as a family beach was further established and the town was becoming a popular place to retire. The new town government increased police protection, mosquito and sanitation control, and street lights and zoning ordinances resulted in increased property values. Public parking and walkways to the beach were established and government offices were constructed. Within the next few years, the town continued to grow through annexation. Improvements were made to streets and water lines and business and residential building boomed. Surfside Beach, as well as the rest of the Grand Strand, became one of the fastest growing parts of the country.

Surfside Beach adopted a public-places smoking ban which took effect October 1, 2007. Surfside Beach is the first town in Horry County to enact such a ban, and one of only a handful in South Carolina to do so at the time.

On February 4, 2023, at 2:39 PM local time, a Chinese spy balloon that had been flying across the United States for days was shot down directly over the town's coast by an AIM-9X Sidewinder launched from a Lockheed Martin F-22 Raptor. US military aircraft were spotted directly overhead of the town minutes before the balloon was shot down.

Demographics

2020 census

As of the 2020 United States census, there were 4,155 people, 2,111 households, and 1,230 families residing in the town.

2000 census
As of the census of 2000, there were 4,425 persons, 2,150 households, and 1,234 families residing in the town. The population density was 2,287.6 people per square mile (885.2/km2). There were 3,698 housing units at an average density of 1,911.8 per square mile (739.8/km2). The racial makeup of the town was 96.75% White, 0.95% African American, 0.50% Native American, 0.36% Asian, 0.02% Pacific Islander, 0.50% from other races, and 0.93% from two or more races. Hispanic or Latino of any race were 1.42% of the population.

There were 2,150 households, out of which 16.8% had children under the age of 18 living with them, 46.8% were married couples living together, 7.9% had a female householder with no husband present, and 42.6% were non-families. 31.8% of all households were made up of individuals, and 11.2% had someone living alone who was 65 years of age or older. The average household size was 2.06 and the average family size was 2.55.

In the town, the population was spread out, with 13.6% under the age of 18, 8.4% from 18 to 24, 28.8% from 25 to 44, 29.7% from 45 to 64, and 19.5% who were 65 years of age or older. The median age was 44 years. For every 100 females, there were 98.1 males. For every 100 females age 18 and over, there were 96.5 males.

The median income for a household in the town was $40,612, and the median income for a family was $49,847. Males had a median income of $31,864 versus $24,966 for females. The per capita income for the town was $24,445. About 4.7% of families and 7.5% of the population were below the poverty line, including 9.2% of those under age 18 and 7.6% of those age 65 or over.

In Surfside Beach, there are thousands of homes and condos owned by non-residents who own vacation property for the sole purpose of attracting weekly vacation rentals.

Government
The city is governed by an elected Council government system. The Council appoints a professional Administrator to manage all day to day activities and operations. As of December 2019, the mayor is Bob Hellyer. Council members are Cindy Keating, Bruce Dietrich, David Pellegrino, Michael Drake, Debbie Scoles, and Paul Holder. The Mayor has no administrative duties and no powers beyond presiding over the meetings and acts as a figurehead of the Town within Councils direction. Council is elected to approve policy and to pass the annual budget.

Transportation

Major roads and highways
 U.S. 17 Bus.
 U.S. 17
 SC 544
Glenns Bay Road
Ocean Boulevard
Surfside Drive

Education
Surfside Beach has a public library, a branch of the Horry County Memorial Library.

Notable person
Russell Fry, U.S. Congressman

References

Towns in Horry County, South Carolina
Towns in South Carolina
Populated coastal places in South Carolina